The 2019–20 Club Puebla season is the 73rd season in the football club's history and the 12th consecutive season in the top flight of Mexican football. The club this season will compete in the Apertura and Clausura tournaments as well as in the Copa MX.

Coaching staff

Players

Squad information

Players and squad numbers last updated on 19 July 2019.Note: Flags indicate national team as has been defined under FIFA eligibility rules. Players may hold more than one non-FIFA nationality.

Transfers

Out

Competitions

Overview

Torneo Apertura

League table

Results summary

Result round by round

Matches

Copa MX

Group stage

Statistics

Squad statistics

Goals

Disciplinary record

References

External links

Mexican football clubs 2019–20 season
Puebla F.C. seasons